Schlumbergera lutea, synonym Hatiora epiphylloides, is a species of flowering plant in the family Cactaceae, subfamily Cactoideae, native to southeast Brazil. It is a shrubby epiphyte, with flattened stems and bright yellow flowers.

Description
Schlumbergera lutea is an epiphyte, with a shrubby growth habit and often pendant stems. It has very small areoles that are without spines.

Taxonomy
The species was first described in 1935, as Rhipsalis epiphylloides. It was transferred to the genus Hatiora in 1983. The generic boundaries within the tribe to which it belongs, Rhipsalideae, have long been unclear. On the basis of a molecular phylogenetic study in 2011, the species was transferred to the genus Schlumbergera. Since the name "Schlumbergera epiphylloides" had already been used for a different species, Calvente and Zappi published the replacement name Schlumbergera lutea.

Distribution
Schlumbergera lutea is found in southeast Brazil, around Rio de Janeiro and São Paulo.

References

lutea
Flora of Southeast Brazil
Plants described in 1935